AMD FX is a series of AMD microprocessors for personal computers. The following is a list of AMD FX brand microprocessors. Some APUs also carry an FX model name, but the term "FX" normally only refers to CPUs which are not just APUs with the iGPU disabled.

Features overview

"Pure" CPUs

APUs 
APU features table

Desktop "pure" CPUs

Athlon 64 Family (90–130 nm) 
These processors were the first AMD CPUs to use the "FX" designation and identified the chip as being higher-performance. The frequency multiplier was unlocked in these chips. See the comprehensive List of AMD Athlon 64 processors

SledgeHammer Core (130 nm) 
 Socket 940
 L1 cache: 64 kb + 64 kb (data + instruction)
 L2 cache: 1024 kb (full speed)
 Instruction sets: MMX, SSE, SSE2, Enhanced 3DNow!, NX bit, AMD64
FX-51 (2.2 GHz) and FX-53 (2.4 GHz)

ClawHammer Core (130 nm) 
 Socket 939
 L1 cache: 64 kb + 64 kb (data + instruction)
 L2 cache: 1024 kb (full speed)
 Instruction sets: MMX, SSE, SSE2, Enhanced 3DNow!, NX bit, AMD64
FX-53 (2.4 GHz) and FX-55 (2.6 GHz)

SanDiego Core (90 nm) 
 Socket 939
 L1 cache: 64 kb + 64 kb (data + instruction)
 L2 cache: 1024 kb (full speed)
 Instruction sets: MMX, SSE, SSE2, SSE3, Enhanced 3DNow!, NX bit, AMD64, Cool'n'Quiet
FX-55 (2.6 GHz) and FX-57 (2.8 GHz)

Toledo Core (90 nm, dual-core) 
 Socket 939
 L1 cache (per core): 64 kb + 64 kb (data + instruction)
 L2 cache (per core): 1024 kb (full speed)
 Instruction sets: MMX, SSE, SSE2, SSE3, Enhanced 3DNow!, NX bit, AMD64, Cool'n'Quiet
FX-60 (2.6 GHz)

Windsor Core (90 nm, dual-core) 
 Socket AM2
 L1 cache (per core): 64 kb + 64 kb (data + instruction)
 L2 cache (per core): 1024 kb (full speed)
 Instruction sets: MMX, SSE, SSE2, SSE3, Enhanced 3DNow!, NX bit, AMD64, Cool'n'Quiet, AMD-V
FX-62 (2.8 GHz)

Windsor Core (90 nm, dual-core, dual-processor) 
 Socket F
 L1 cache (per core): 64 kb + 64 kb (data + instruction)
 L2 cache (per core): 1024 kb (full speed)
 Instruction sets: MMX, SSE, SSE2, SSE3, Enhanced 3DNow!, NX bit, AMD64, Cool'n'Quiet, AMD-V
FX-70 (2.6 GHz), FX-72 (2.8 GHz), FX-74 (3.0 GHz)

Bulldozer Family (32 nm) 
 All models binned from 8 logical cores with simple OROCHI die production, in 938 pins µPGA package AM3+ socket.
 All AMD FX microprocessors are unlocked and overclockable.
 Two Integers-Clusters (seen as logical cores from OS) in each Bulldozer Module. 
 4 Bulldozer modules within FX-8 series, 3 in FX-6 series, and 2 in FX-4 series.
 All models support up to 4 DIMMs of DDR3-1866 memory.

Bulldozer Core (Zambezi, 32 nm) 

 Codenamed: Zambezi
 Transistors: ~1.6 billion (real node count)
 Die size: 319 mm2 (real measured up size)
 L1 data cache (per core): 16 kb
 L1 instruction cache (per module): 64 kb
 L2 cache (per module): 2048 kb
 All models support: MMX(+),  SSE1 - 2 - 3 - 3s - 4.1 - 4.2 - 4a, NX bit, AMD64, AMD-V, IOMMU, AES, CLMUL, AVX, XOP, FMA4, F16C, ABM, Turbo Core 2.0, PowerNow!, ECC

Piledriver Core (Vishera, 32 nm) 

 Codenamed: Vishera
 L1 data cache (per core): 16 kb
 L1 instruction cache (per module): 64 kb
 L2 cache (per module): 2048 kb
 All models support: MMX(+), SSE1 - 2 - 3 - 3s - 4.1 - 4.2 - 4a, NX bit, AMD64, AMD-V, IOMMU, AES, CLMUL, AVX, AVX 1.1, XOP, FMA3, FMA4, F16C, ABM, BMI1, TBM, Turbo Core 3.0, PowerNow!, EVP (Enhanced Virus Protection), ECC

Notes 
 AMD later re-used the FX designation for some processors in its socket FM2/FM2+ APU lineup.
 The FX-9590 and FX-9370 originally launched as OEM exclusive parts which retailers listed for $920 and $576 respectively. By October they were released to retail channels in a kit with a liquid cooler at $390 and $290.
 ^ All models support AMD Turbo Core, v2.0 for BULLDOZER and v3.0 for PILEDRIVER.
 ^ The clock multiplier is applied to the 200 MHz HyperTransport base clock.
 ^ A line of Socket F and Socket AM2 processors launched in 2006 were named Athlon 64 FX, the first being the AMD FX-60.
 ^ A Line of Phenom FX processors was revealed May 2007 and was branded the "FASN8" platform.
 ^ Sold with a liquid cooling kit.

See also 
 AMD FX
 List of AMD chipsets
 List of AMD accelerated processing units – desktop, mobile and ultra-low-power
 List of AMD Opteron processors – server
 Table of AMD processors

References

External links 
 AMD FX Processors

Lists of microprocessors